Liberty Road may refer to:
 Liberty Road (France), a historical commemorative road in northern France
 Liberty Road (Maryland), a state highway in the U.S. state of Maryland
 Liberty Road (Rio Grande National Forest), a road in Rio Grande National Forest